E Pluribus Unum is the third album by folk guitarist Sandy Bull, released in 1969 through Vanguard Records.

Track listing

Personnel 
Joel Brodsky – photography
Sandy Bull – guitar, bass guitar, oud, percussion, tambourine, cowbell
Gary Cox – photography
Fred Holtz – design
Maynard Solomon – production

See also
E pluribus unum, de facto United States national motto until 1956

External links

References 

1969 albums
Vanguard Records albums
Sandy Bull albums